Kolos is a fitness-sport society of the Agro-Industrial Complex of Ukraine, formerly a rural sports society and a trade unions - cooperative sports society that was uniting farmers, workers, servicemen, technicians of agricultural organizations, enterprises, establishments, and educational institutions. Created in 1950 under the name of "Kolhospnyk" (farmer of kolkhoz), it changed its name to Kolos in 1970.

Description
On January 1, 1979 it accounted for 13,835 primary collectives with over three millions of sportsmen.

The society was cultivating 45 types of sports. 

In 1982 the society merged with its Russian counterpart "Urozhai".

In 1990 the society was revived in the Ukrainian SSR and later - Ukraine.

Olympic centers
 Sports base "Zakarpattia", Berehove
 Luge youth sports school "Kolos", Kremenets
 Sports base "Kolos", Pidhorodnie (Ternopil Raion)

References

External links
 Kolos (sports society) at Ukrainian Soviet Encyclopedia
 Official website
 List of Olympic centers
 Andriy Andrushchenko. Analysis of the state budget expenditures for financing of the All-Ukrainian Fitness and Sports Association "Kolos" of the Agro-Industrial Complex of Ukraine (Аналіз видатків держбюджету на фінансування Всеукраїнського фізкультурно-спортивного товариства «Колос» АПК України). LB.ua. 10 June 2015

Sports societies in the Ukrainian Soviet Socialist Republic
1950 establishments in Ukraine
Sport societies in Ukraine
Sports clubs established in 1950
Federation of Trade Unions of Ukraine